"Graduation Day" is a song composed by Joe Sherman with lyrics by his brother Noel Sherman. and was a 1956 hit song by the Four Freshmen.

Background
The song is about nostalgia and was an important influence in the early rock era.

Chart performance
In the US, the Four Freshmen recording reached number 27 on the Best Sellers in Stores chart. in 1956.  The version by the Canadian vocal group, The Rover Boys (named after the popular college-themed literary characters), reached number 16 on the U.S. charts.

Cover versions
Bobby Pickett released his own version of the song in 1963.
The song was a concert staple of the Beach Boys, who were deeply influenced by the Four Freshmen. A recording of it was featured on the live Capitol Records album Beach Boys Concert (1964).
In 1967, The Arbors, recorded their version and included on their, The Arbors Sing Valley Of The Dolls LP.

References

1956 singles
Capitol Records singles
1956 songs
Songs with lyrics by Noel Sherman
Songs written by Joe Sherman (songwriter)
Songs about nostalgia
Graduation songs